The state of Huo was a vassal state in China, which lasted from the Western Zhou Dynasty to the early years of the Spring and Autumn period.

After the founding of the Western Zhou and the overthrow of the Shang Dynasty, Shuchu (霍叔處), a brother of King Wu of Zhou, who was dispatched to found a colony at Huo. A chief purpose of this fiefdom was to control the former homeland of the Shang Dynasty, forming the Three Guards along with the states of Cai) and Guan.

However, after the death of King Wu and the regency of the Duke of Zhou, the Three Guards colluded with the Shang rulers and launched a revolt against the Zhou court. This revolt was defeated, and Shuchu was stripped of his titles and demoted to a commoner. Subsequently, however, the lands of Huo were given to Shuchu's son, thereby continuing the rule of their branch, which would last until 661 BC when the state was annexed by Jin.

7th-century BC disestablishments in China
States and territories disestablished in the 7th century BC
11th-century BC establishments in China